Hymedesmiidae is a family of demosponges in the order Poecilosclerida.

Genera 
 Acanthancora 
 Hamigera 
 Hemimycale 
 Hymedesmia 
 Kirkpatrickia 
 Myxodoryx 
 Phorbas 
 Plocamionida 
 Pseudohalichondria 
 Spanioplon

References 

 Evcen, A., Çinar, M.E., Zengin, M., Süer, S. & Rüzgar, M. 2016. New records of five sponge species (Porifera) for the Black Sea. Zootaxa, 4103(3), pages 267–275,

External links 
 
 

Poecilosclerida
Sponge families